Caenis anceps is a species of mayfly in the genus Caenis.

References
 NatureServe Explorer October 2015. Retrieved October 2016.

Mayflies
Insects described in 2001